Poul-Henning Kamp (born 1966) is a Danish computer software developer known for work on various projects including FreeBSD and Varnish. He currently resides in Slagelse, Denmark.

Involvement in the FreeBSD project

Poul-Henning Kamp has been committing to the FreeBSD project for most of its duration. He is responsible for the widely used MD5crypt implementation of the MD5 password hash algorithm,
a vast quantity of systems code including the FreeBSD GEOM storage layer, GBDE cryptographic storage transform, part of the UFS2 file system implementation, FreeBSD Jails, malloc library, and the FreeBSD and NTP timecounters code.

Varnish cache
He is the lead architect and developer for the open source Varnish cache project, an HTTP accelerator.

Dispute with D-Link

In 2006, Kamp had a dispute with electronics manufacturer D-Link in which he claimed they were committing NTP vandalism by embedding the IP address of his NTP servers in their routers. The dispute was resolved in April 2006.

Other

A post by Kamp on the FreeBSD mailing lists is responsible for the popularization of the term bike shed discussion, and the derived term bikeshedding, to describe Parkinson's law of triviality in open source projects - when the amount of discussion that a subject receives is inversely proportional to its importance. Poul-Henning Kamp is known for his preference of a Beerware license to the GNU General Public License (GPL).

Anti-semitism accusations 
On May 8, 2019, Kamp tweeted "I thought anti-semitism was *unfounded* hatred of Jews? If you hate them because they did something awful, like implement apartheid, it is not anti-semitism, but perfectly justified critique of people who in particular should know better than that." In a blog post later, he wrote that "I will readily admit that it was probably not my most skilled use of Twitter, but I stand by my point", explaining the point in more nuance. In the blog post, Kamp goes on to say that "Jews everywhere in the world should be appalled and up in arms over the atrocities against UN's Human Rights being done in the name of their religion", and that he "detest[s] the vast silent majority of them who fail to do so."

Publications 
Poul-Henning Kamp has published a substantial number of articles over the years in publications like Communications of the ACM and ACM Queue mostly on the topics of computing and time keeping. 
A selection of publications:
 USENIX ATC 1998 FREENIX track, "malloc(3) Revisited"
 USENIX BSDCon 2003, GBDE-GEOM Based Disk Encryption
 USENIX BSDCon 2002, Rethinking /dev and devices in the UNIX kernel
 ACM Queue: Building Systems to be Shared Securely
 ACM Queue: You're doing it wrong
 ACM Queue: A Generation Lost in the Bazaar
 Communications of the ACM 2011: The Most Expensive One-Byte Mistake
 Communications of the ACM 2011: The One-Second War

References

External links

 people.freebsd.org homepage
 phk.freebsd.dk homepage
 Blog in Danish
 Another blog in Danish
 Resolution of D-Link Dispute
 Varnish cache

1966 births
Living people
Danish computer programmers
Danish computer scientists
Free software programmers
FreeBSD people
Articles containing video clips
People from Slagelse